Baković is a Croatian and Bosnian surname. Notable people with the name include:

 Branko Baković (born 1981), Serbian footballer
 Duje Baković (born 1986), Croatian footballer
 Eric Baković, American linguist
 Ivan Baković, Croatian soldier and convicted war criminal
 Marijo Baković (born 1982), Croatian long jumper
 Peter Bakovic (born 1965), Canadian ice hockey player
 Rajka Baković (1920–1941), Croatian student and member of anti-fascist resistance

Croatian surnames